Nelson City is an unincorporated community in Kendall County, Texas, United States. It is located between Boerne and Comfort. While not recorded by the U.S. Census Bureau, it had an estimated population of 50 in 2010. It has never had a post office, and shares ZIP code 78006 with nearby Boerne.

History
The community was established by an area rancher, Edwin Nelson, for whom it is named. Nelson constructed a gas station and dance hall at the location in the late 1920s.

References

Greater San Antonio
Unincorporated communities in Kendall County, Texas
Unincorporated communities in Texas